Bad Luck and Trouble is the eleventh book in the Jack Reacher series written by Lee Child. It was published in 2007, and written in the third person.

The title is derived from the song lyrics by singer Albert King "Born Under a Bad Sign".

Amazon Prime Video selected the book for their second TV production of their Reacher series.

Plot summary
A man with two broken legs is thrown out of a corporate helicopter from 3,000 feet above the California desert.

Seventeen days after that, Reacher is roaming alone with no objectives, no phone, no address, just the clothes he's wearing and his ATM card, when he sees an anonymous deposit to his bank account. Reacher automatically analyses the amount, using his math obsession and investigative skills. Also obsessed with math, Frances Neagley (previously seen in Without Fail) is the sender of $1,030.00, which Reacher recognizes as their old army code, 10–30, for urgent help needed. He meets up with Neagley in California and they discover the death of Calvin Franz, one of nine members of their elite team of ex–army investigators, who are being hunted down one by one. After getting no reply from anyone else, their suspicions rise and Neagley convinces him to put the old unit back together. Reacher and Neagley find that three of the other five members are missing, while Stan Lowery had a fatal car accident years earlier. They conclude Franz called the others for help with a major problem but left out the remaining four that resided too far away to get to him quickly, apart from Reacher, who is famously untraceable.

Reacher and Neagley visit Franz's widow and child, Angela and Charlie. Angela is not surprised to see them and says that Franz told her all about the team, which made her feel like he had been married before, to them. Reacher notes if people were lucky like the team, they became family, but Franz got even luckier with her and Charlie, with Angela replying "but his luck ran out". The visit produces no useful information about Franz's death, but Angela gives them Franz's office keys, which Reacher and Neagley find gutted and trashed. They realise the perpetrators didn't find what they were looking for and that Franz kept his home life completely separate from his business, leading Franz to mail any dangerous computer data to himself, with triple backup of refreshed computer USB flash drives on rotating days. They find his flash memory sticks in his business post-office box and try unsuccessfully to crack the password. More information on the other team members shows that Franz was unlikely to be the one who called for help. Reacher and Neagley go to former team member Tony Swan's workplace, defense contractor New Age in search of information, but are sent away with basically nothing by the HR manager, Margaret Berenson, except that Swan had been unemployed by them three weeks prior.

They meet David O'Donnell at their hotel, confirming three of the team are alive. O'Donnell cracks the password to Franz's flash drives and the team reviews a set of bizarre numbers which they conclude to be scores, and an unfamiliar name "Adrian Mount" with four aliases. The trio then go to Swan's home for more clues. Following Reacher and his team is an unmarked car, which they trap to discourage the driver. After roughing him up they find out the driver is an LA County Deputy named Thomas Brant, but outside of his jurisdiction in Orange County, CA. The team decides to ditch their rental car for a new one and run into Karla Dixon. With four of the team now confirmed alive, they proceed to source money, cars and weapons. Except for Reacher, all the team members have "moved onward and upward" from the military, making Reacher reconsider his drifting. He is happy for the others' successes but feels as if he is "treading water while the rest are swimming". Putting aside conflicting reactions at seeing his team again, Reacher focuses on the three missing members; Manuel Orozco, Jorge Sanchez and Tony Swan, and which one was in a situation so bad they couldn't handle it on their own and called for help.

Unsurprised, Reacher is visited by Brant and his boss, Curtis Mauney, a Los Angeles County Sheriff's Department detective. But Reacher is surprised when Mauney tells him that Reacher and his team are bait for whoever killed Franz and caused Swan, Sanchez and Orozco to be reported missing. Mauney's LA deputies and Las Vegas police frequently work together and recent information had linked the dead and the missing with Reacher's team. Neagley gets a response regarding Swan's company New Age from Diana Bond, a staffer for a guy on the House Defense Committee, that Reacher and his team distrust, but they pressure Diana for confidential information on New Age and its military contracts.

Mauney later contacts the team with information on Jorge Sanchez's death and Vegas police evidence on Adrian Mount with three aliases, one less than Franz had. Sanchez and Orozco were partners in a Las Vegas casino security firm, and the team drives to Las Vegas for clues and answers on Sanchez and the still missing Orozco. Reacher and his team seek out the major casino security directors about the possibility of Sanchez and Orozco being involved in a large scale internal multi-casino thief network and are told about Sanchez's girlfriend, who leads them to Orozco's wife and children. An assassination attempt is made on Reacher and his team but they kill the assassin and take his car, which Reacher recalls from their LA hotel. Reacher uses the cell phone in the car to return-dial the last number on the call list, telling the man who answers that his assassin failed, the team knows he is behind their unit's dead members and they are coming for him.

From Las Vegas they are told to meet Mauney at the hospital, leading Reacher to conclude that Sanchez is not dead, just severely injured. O'Donnell and Dixon go to the hospital and Reacher and Neagley go to find Margaret Berenson, after they realise that she has been lying to them. They find that New Age has been producing state of the art surface to air missiles and pretending to destroy the prototypes, while selling them to foreign terrorists. Neagley and Reacher leave Berenson's house after finding out Berenson is being blackmailed by New Age's corrupt director, Allen Lamaison, who has threatened to harm her son if she reveals what she knows.  Upon discovering this, Reacher and Neagley arrange a safe hiding place for them. After investigating Lamaison, they also discover that Lamaison used to be a police officer before joining New Age, and his partner was none other than Curtis Mauney.  From this, Reacher and Neagley deduce that Lamaison and Mauney are working together.  O'Donnell and Dixon are captured by Mauney's men in the hospital and taken to New Age's Director, Allen Lamaison. Reacher and Neagley track Mauney down, take his suitcase containing the terrorists' payment of $65 million, and kill him. At the second New Age complex, Reacher stows away on the same helicopter as Lamaison, where he finds O'Donnell and Dixon tied up and about to be thrown off and killed the same way that Franz, Orozco, Sanchez and Swan were. Reacher confronts Lamaison just in time, kills his assistant and pushes Lamaison out of the helicopter once it is fully one mile above ground level. After the helicopter lands Reacher asks the pilot if he flew for each of the murders and after confirmation, Reacher kills the pilot as well.

The last part is the terrorist weapons buyer, who Reacher concludes does not know how to use them. The team finds the one New Age staff engineer capable of teaching the terrorist how to use the weapons, and who is being threatened with his daughter's torture. Reacher poses as the engineer briefly as the terrorist arrives, then he and Neagley tie the terrorist up, leaving him for FBI to find. Later, the four team members agree to set up trust funds for the murdered team members' loved ones, with a donation to PETA for Tony Swan's only family, his dog Maisi, and split the remaining money obtained from the bad guys. After going their separate ways, Reacher receives a deposit for over $100,000 in his account, automatically analyses it, and thinks the amount is just a boring plain number. He feels disappointed and let down by Dixon, the money manager of the group. But the detailed report shows multiple deposits, "101810.18. 10012 ... Military police radio code for mission accomplished, twice over. 10–18, 10–18 ... second deposit was her zip code: 10012. Greenwich Village. Where she lived." Reacher remembers her inviting him to visit her in New York, and considers a moment, but remembering his words to her that he "Doesn't make plans", withdraws a $100 and buys a ticket on the first bus available, with no idea where it is going.

Notable characters
 Jack Reacher
 Frances Neagley
 Dave O'Donnell
 Karla Dixon
 Allen Lamaison
 Margaret Berenson (sometimes referred to as 'Dragon Lady')
 Curtis Mauney
 Azhari Mahmoud (terrorist weapons buyer, also known as Adrian Mount, Alan Mason, Andrew MacBride, Anthony Matthews)

Production
Child began forming the plot on 21 June 2005, when he remembered that it was ten years to the day he had been fired from a previous job, leading to the why and how he became a writer. He then thought about old colleagues, workmates, buddies, that he went through a lot with, and wondered where they all were, what were they doing, were they doing well or struggling, were they happy, what did they look like, and leading to full nostalgia: feelings that high school, college, old jobs, old towns moved away from, that everyone shares.  He decided to make the next Reacher book about a reunion, "among a bunch of old colleagues that he hadn't seen for ten years, people that he loved fiercely and respected deeply. Regular Reacher readers will know that he's a pretty self-confident guy, but I wanted him to wobble just a little this time, to compare his choices with theirs, to measure himself against them." When Reacher's old friend tells him in the novel's beginning to "put the old unit back together", Child notes, "It's an irresistible invitation. Wouldn't we all like to do that, sometimes?"

The front of Bad Luck and Trouble has a dedication "For the real Frances L. Neagley", who is a real person. Frances Neagley won a Bouchercon charity auction to have a character named after them in Child's novel

Reception
Publishers Weekly reported, "[P]ractically nothing is what it seems, and the meticulously detailed route to the truth proves especially engrossing thanks to the joint efforts of this band of brothers (and two sisters)... their smart-ass banter masking an unspoken affection. The villains' comeuppance, a riveting eye-for-an-eye battle scene (hint: helicopter), is one of Child's more satisfying finales."
The New York Times wrote, "Bad Luck and Trouble unfolds with the simple, immaculate logic that makes this series utterly addictive."
The Portland Tribune noted, "Guaranteed to keep you flipping pages... ruthlessly and relentlessly effective."

References

External links
 Bad Luck and Trouble information page on Lee Child's official website.

2007 British novels
English novels
Jack Reacher books
Bantam Press books
Delacorte Press books